UEFITool is a software program for reading and modifying EEPROM images that contain an UEFI firmware. Features include the ability to view the flash regions and to extract and import them.

References

External links 
 UEFITool GitHub repository

Unified Extensible Firmware Interface
Free software programmed in C++